Killing No Murder is a pamphlet published in 1657 during The Protectorate period of the English Interregnum era of English history.  The pamphlet of disputed authorship advocates the assassination of Oliver Cromwell.  The publication was in high demand at the time of its distribution.  Cromwell was said to have been so disturbed after the publication of Killing No Murder that he never spent more than two nights in the same place and always took extreme precaution in planning his travel.

The pamphlet asks three questions, which highlight the purpose of the document (from page 9 of the 1743 re-print):

 What is a Tyrant?
 Is it honourable to kill a tyrant?
 Will the outcome of killing a tyrant be beneficial to the state?

The author(s) of the pamphlet highlight arguments and statements from Aristotle, Plato, Plutarch, Solon's law, Xenophon, Cicero, and other historical writings, as well as contemporaries from the 17th century (e.g., Hugo Grotius) to make the case that to murder a tyrant is (and has forever been) an honourable act.  The full document describes the traits of a tyrant in 14 points, of which the most prevailing are:

 Prior military leadership service—tyrants are often former captains or generals, which allows them to assume a degree of honour, loyalty, and reputability regarding matters of state
 Fraud over force—most tyrants are likely to manipulate their way into supreme power than force it militarily
 Defamation and/or disbanding of formerly respectable persons, intellectuals, or institutions, and the discouragement of refined thinking or public involvement in state affairs
 Absence or minimalisation of collective input, bargaining, or debate (assemblies, conferences, etc.)
 Amplification of military activity for the purposes of public distraction, raising new levies, or opening future business pathways
 Tit-for-tat symbiosis in domestic relations: e.g. finding religious ideas permissible insofar as they are useful and flattering of the tyrant; finding aristocrats or the nobility laudable & honourable insofar as they are compliant with the will of the tyrant or in service of the tyrant, etc.
 Pretenses toward inspiration from God
 Pretenses toward a love of God and religion
 Grow or maintain public impoverishment or instability as a way of removing the efficacy of the people's will

"First, therefore, 'a Usurper that by only force possesses himself of government, and by force only keep it, is yet in the state of war with every man,' says the learned Grotius, 'and therefore everything is lawful against him that is lawful against an open enemy, whom every private man hath a right to kill.'"

Other key points:

-As one who submits to no law, a tyrant is not an entity *of* the state so much as an entity outside of it, or above it.  As such, a tyrant should not have the protections due through law, or any defence from law since the tyrant acknowledges no laws dictating his own actions.  "He that flies justice in the courts, must expect justice in the streets."

Text from Killing No Murder
The first section of the text reads as follows:

"To his Highness, Oliver Cromwell.

To your Highness justly belongs the Honour of dying for the people, and it cannot choose but be unspeakable consolation to you in the last moments of your life to consider with how much benefit to the world you are like to leave it. 'Tis then only (my Lord) the titles you now usurp, will be truly yours; you will then be indeed the deliverer of your country, and free it from a bondage little inferior to that from which Moses delivered his. You will then be that true reformer which you would be thought. Religion shall be then restored, liberty asserted and Parliaments have those privileges they have fought for. We shall then hope that other laws will have place besides those of the sword, and that justice shall be otherwise defined than the will and pleasure of the strongest; and we shall then hope men will keep oaths again, and not have the necessity of being false and perfidious to preserve themselves, and be like their rulers. All this we hope from your Highness's happy expiration, who are the true father of your country; for while you live we can call nothing ours, and it is from your death that we hope for our inheritances. Let this consideration arm and fortify your Highness's mind against the fears of death and the terrors of your evil conscience, that the good you will do by your death will something balance the evils of your life."

A full scan of the book is available online; see the 'external links' section below.

Possible authors

Killing No Murder was published under the pseudonym 'William Allen' but the authorship is largely attributed to one of three individuals or some combination of the three. The individuals generally attributed with authorship are (in order):  Colonel Silius Titus, Edward Sexby or William Allen.

Silius Titus
Colonel Titus was a politician and one of two individuals who claimed authorship of the work. Titus' claim could stand on its own merit due to the highly sarcastic nature of the document—a trait often attributed to Titus.  In response to claims that he often "made sport of the House" and didn't take matters seriously, Titus remarked that things were not to be taken seriously simply because they were dull.  Titus' tone can be seen throughout the document and on that alone, many attribute the work to him before he admitted to writing it.  Additionally, Charles II of England awarded Titus the title of Gentleman of the Bedchamber for his service in authoring the work.

Edward Sexby
Edward Sexby had returned to England to try where Miles Sindercombe had failed in exacting the call for assassination found in Killing No Murder. After failing, he was caught trying to escape to Amsterdam and was imprisoned in the Tower of London.  It was there that Sexby went insane and died a year later in 1658. Before his death, he was coerced by Sir John Barkstead to admit his participation in the writing of the pamphlet.

William Allen
While it was often assumed that the document was written under a pseudonym, another theory suggested that William Allen, a former New Model Army trooper and Republican who had ties with Edward Sexby and Thomas Sheppard, had penned the document. The trio (Allen, Sexby and Sheppard) had agitated Cromwell in the past by expressing their concerns about the Army's attitude toward Parliament.  It is possible that Allen, therefore, wrote the document brazenly himself before he died but is more likely named as the author as retribution from one of the other two authors.

References

External links
British History Online: Parishes Bushey
British History Online: Parishes Ramsey
Edgar Allan Poe Marginalia - Part IV
Google Book Search - Killing no Murder
Full Text

1657 books
Plots, conspiracies and insurrections during the Interregnum (England)
Pamphlets
Stuart England